Dendronotus arcticus is a species of sea slugs, a dendronotid nudibranch, a shell-less marine gastropod mollusc in the family Dendronotidae.

Distribution 
This species was described from four specimens collected together at 15 m depth in the Laptev Sea, .

References

Dendronotidae
Gastropods described in 2016